Ākāśagarbha (Standard Tibetan Namkha'i Nyingpo, Vietnamese Hư Không Tạng Bồ Tát) is a bodhisattva in Chinese, Japanese and Korean Buddhism who is associated with the great element (mahābhūta) of space (ākāśa). He is also sometimes called Gaganagañja, which means "sky-jewel."

Overview
Ākāśagarbha is regarded as one of the eight great bodhisattvas. His name can be translated as "boundless space treasury" or "void store" as his wisdom is said to be boundless as space itself. He is sometimes known as the twin brother of the "earth store" bodhisattva Kṣitigarbha, and is even briefly mentioned in the Kṣitigarbha Bodhisattva Pūrvapraṇidhāna Sūtra.

Kūkai, the founder of Shingon Buddhism, met a famous monk who is said to have repeatedly chanted a mantra of Ākāśagarbha as a young Buddhist acolyte. Kūkai took a tutorial with him on Kokuzou-Gumonji (a secret doctrine method, 虚空蔵求聞持法). As he chanted the mantra, he experienced a vision whereby Ākāśagarbha told him to go to Tang China to seek understanding of the Mahāvairocana Abhisaṃbodhi Sūtra. Later he would go to China to learn Tangmi from Huiguo, and then go on to found the Shingon sect of esoteric Buddhism in Heian Japan.

Sutras
There are several Mahāyāna sūtras in which Ākāśagarbha Bodhisattva is a central figure:
《大集大虚空藏菩薩所問經》 (Ārya Gaganagañja Paripṛcchā Nāma Mahāyāna Sūtra T.0404)
《虛空藏菩薩經》 (Ākāśagarbha Bodhisattva Sūtra T.405)
《佛説虚空藏菩薩神呪經》(Buddha Speaks the Ākāśagarbha Bodhisattva Dhāraṇī Sūtra T.406)
《虛空藏菩薩神呪經》(Ākāśagarbha Bodhisattva Dhāraṇī Sūtra T.0407)
《虛空孕菩薩經》 (Ākāśagarbha Bodhisattva Sūtra T.0408)
《觀虚空藏菩薩經 》(The Meditation on Ākāśagarbha Bodhisattva Sūtra T.0409)
《虚空藏菩薩能滿諸願最勝心陀羅尼求聞持法》(The Method of the Victorious, Essential Dharāṇi for Having Wishes Heard by the Bodhisattva Space-Store  Who Can Fulfill Requests T.1145)
《大虚空藏菩薩念誦法》 (The Method of Invoking the Great Ākāśagarbha Bodhisattva  T.1146)
《聖虛空藏菩薩陀羅尼經》 (Dhāraṇī of the Space-Store Bodhisattva T.1147)
《佛説虚空藏陀羅尼》 (Buddha Speaks the Ākāśagarbha Dharāṇi　T.1148)
《五大虚空藏菩薩速疾大神驗祕密式經》(The Five Great Ākāśagarbha Bodhisattvas Sūtra T.1149)
《虛空藏菩薩問七佛陀羅尼呪經》(Ārya Saptabuddhaka Sūtra or Dhāraṇī of the Space-Store Bodhisattvaʼs Questions to Seven Buddhas T.1333)
《如來方便善巧呪經》 (Incantation of the Tathāgatas' Skillful Means T.1334)

Additionally, he appears briefly in the final chapter of the Kṣitigarbha Bodhisattva Pūrvapraṇidhāna Sūtra, requesting the Buddha preach on the benefits of praising both the Sūtra and Kṣitigarbha.

Five Great Ākāśagarbhas
The Five Great Ākāśagarbhas are manifestation of the Five Wisdom Buddhas. They are said to bring about an increase of benefits such as good health. Within the traditional mandala, they are arranged as follows:

Mantras
The mantra of Ākāśagarbha is believed to give rise to wisdom and creativity, and dispel ignorance.
Traditional Chinese: 南無 虚空藏 菩薩 
Chinese (Pinyin): 
Japanese (Rōmaji): 
Korean: 
Vietnamese: 
Translation: Homage to Ākāśagarbha Bodhisattva

Another mantra also exists for Ākāśagarbha Bodhisattva:

Sanskrit: 
Traditional Chinese: 南牟，阿迦捨，揭婆耶，唵，阿唎，迦麼唎，慕唎，莎嚩訶
Chinese (Pinyin): 
Japanese (Rōmaji): 
Translation: Homage to Ākāśagarbha, Om - Crown of the Noble Enemy of Kāma - svāhā

References

Bibliography
 
 
 
 Visser, M. W. de (1931). The Bodhisattva Akasagarbha (Kokuzo) in China and Japan, Amsterdam: The Royal Dutch Academy of Sciences.

External links

English Translation of the Ākāśagarbha Sūtra from the Tibetan on 84000.
Gumonji : A possible cure for memory loss The Japan Times
Japanese Buddhist Statuary: Kokuzo
The Koyasan Shingon-shu Lay Practitioner's Daily Service

Bodhisattvas
Buddhist tantras
Buddhist mantras